Ringo is a two-player strategy board game from Germany, invented perhaps in the late 19th or early 20th century. There are different versions of the game having different rules, the version described here is from R.C. Bell's Discovering Old Board Games (1973) which is a translation from a German text by M. C. Oswald. The game simulates a siege of a citadel. Attackers are attempting to enter the citadel while defenders are trying to protect it and reduce the number of attackers.

Capture by leap is similar to that of draughts or Alquerque. Capture by displacement is exactly as in chess. The Ringo board features a special segment called the neutral zone where pieces are immune from capture.

Setup 
The board is circular consisting of a central circle (called the citadel) and five concentric rings surrounding the citadel.  Eight lines radiate from the citadel.  This creates 40 spaces outside the citadel, which follow a checkered color scheme of light and dark colors, specifically white and black outside the neutral zone, and white and gray within the neutral zone.  The citadel is colored white.

There are seven black attacker pieces, and four white defender pieces. The seven attackers are initially placed at the farthest ring from the citadel, one per space; the space in the neutral zone is left empty.  There are four defenders in the first ring (the ring closest to the citadel), leaving one empty space between them such that the space in the neutral zone is also empty.

Players decide who will be the attackers and who will be the defenders.

Rules 
  Players alternate their turns using one piece to either move or capture per turn. R.C. Bell doesn't specify who moves first.
  A space may be occupied by only one piece, with the exception that the citadel can be occupied by two attackers.
  Attackers can move one space toward the citadel, or one space left or right on the same ring. Attackers may not move away from the citadel.  The space being moved to must be vacant with the exception of the citadel.
  Defenders can move one space away from or towards the citadel, but they cannot enter the citadel. They may also move left or right any number of unoccupied spaces on the same ring; however, if moving into a space in the neutral zone, the defender must stop and end its turn.  This prevents defenders from moving indefinitely around the ring.
  Both attackers and defenders can capture by leap or displacement. Only one piece may be captured in a turn. A captured piece is removed from the board. Captures are not compulsory. There are some capturing restrictions: 
 Multiple captures are not allowed within a turn.    
 A piece in the neutral zone is immune from capture.
 A player's piece in the neutral zone cannot leap over and capture an enemy piece that's also in the neutral zone, nor can it capture the enemy piece by displacement.
 A player's piece outside the neutral zone cannot leap over and capture an enemy piece in the neutral zone, nor can it capture the enemy piece by displacement.      
 A capture may not begin from the neutral zone and end outside the neutral zone.  Therefore, a player's piece inside the neutral zone cannot capture by leap or displacement an enemy piece on the same ring outside the neutral zone.  Nor can a defender in the first ring and in the neutral zone leap over an attacker in the citadel and capture it.      
 But a capture beginning outside the neutral zone may end in the neutral zone, and this usually happens along a ring with a capture by leap method.  The only other instance this happens, is when a defender leaps over an attacker inside the citadel, and lands in the first ring of the neutral zone.
 Rule #14 from R.C. Bell's book states that "Neither player can attack an opposing piece with a piece in the neutral zone."
  Both attackers and defenders can capture one another by the short leap as in draughts or Alquerque.  The piece leaps over the enemy piece that is adjacent to it either one space toward or away from the citadel, or one space left or right on the same ring, and lands on a vacant space adjacently behind in the direction of the leap.
  The defender can however move any number of unoccupied spaces (that are outside the neutral zone) along a ring towards a (non-adjacent) attacker, and leap over it, landing on an vacant adjacent space behind in the direction of the leap.  The defender can land inside the neutral zone.
  An attacker from the second ring (but outside the neutral zone) can leap over an adjacent defender in the first ring, and land inside the citadel.  The defender is captured and removed as well.  
  Restrictions regarding the neutral zone as mentioned above apply.
  Both attackers and defenders can capture one another by displacement as in chess.  
 An attacker can only capture by displacement an adjacent defender.  An attacker can even capture an adjacent defender "behind" it.  The attacker replaces the captured defender on the space it occupied.  
 The defender may capture an adjacent attacker by displacement.  The defender may also move any number of unoccupied spaces (that are outside the neutral zone) along a ring towards a (non-adjacent) attacker, and capture it by displacement.  The defender replaces the attacker on the space it occupied.  
 Attackers and defenders cannot capture an enemy piece in the neutral zone by displacement, because pieces in the neutral zone cannot be captured.
 The number of attackers in the neutral zone cannot be more than the number of defenders left on the board.  For example, if there are two defenders left in the game, then there can only be up to two attackers in the whole neutral zone.
  A defender can leap over the citadel, and capture an attacker in it, provided the leap does not begin from the neutral zone.  But as mentioned earlier, the defender can end its leap inside the neutral zone.
  The attackers win if two of its pieces enter the citadel.
  The defenders win if they reduce the number of attackers to one, or block their movements.

Another version 
Ringo is described in The Way to Play (1975) with somewhat different board and rules from those described by R.C. Bell. The differences are:
 The board consists of six concentric rings (not five).
 Captures are performed only by leaps (not displacements).
 Captures can begin in the neutral zone and end outside the neutral zone.
 A defender can move only one space when moving left or right on a ring (not any number of unoccupied spaces). A defender can capture only an adjacent attacker.
 The attacker moves first.

Notes

References

Further reading

External links 
 Ringo instructions
 Games of Soldiers - RINGO
 Printable game board, rules, and strategies

19th-century board games
Abstract strategy games